Meredith Jones is an Australian Paralympic athlete.  She participated in athletics in the 1984 New York/Stoke Mandeville Games and won a silver medal at the 1988 Seoul Games in the Women's 4x400 m Relay 2–6 event.

References

External links
 

Year of birth missing (living people)
Living people
Paralympic athletes of Australia
Paralympic silver medalists for Australia
Paralympic medalists in athletics (track and field)
Athletes (track and field) at the 1984 Summer Paralympics
Athletes (track and field) at the 1988 Summer Paralympics
Medalists at the 1988 Summer Paralympics
Australian female wheelchair racers